Chiromyiformes is an order of strepsirrhine primates that includes the aye-aye from Madagascar and its extinct relatives.

Classification

The aye-aye is sometimes classified as a member of Lemuriformes, but others treat Chiromyiformes as a separate infraorder, based on their very reduced dental formula. Gunnell et al. (2018) reclassified the putative bat Propotto as a close relative of the aye-aye, as well as assigning the problematic strepsirrhine primate Plesiopithecus to Chiromyiformes.

Evolution
The molecular clock puts the divergence of Chiromyiformes and Lemuriformes at 50-49 million years ago.

References

External links
 Primate Behavior: Aye-Aye
 ARKive – images and movies of the aye-aye (Daubentonia madagascariensis)
 Primate Info Net Daubentonia madagascariensis Factsheet
 U.S. Fish & Wildlife Service Species Profile

EDGE species
Lemurs
Mammals of Madagascar